The 7.65×20mm Long (also known as 7.65mm French Long/Longue, 7.65mm MAS, 7.65×20mm, 7.65L, and .30-18 Auto for use in the Pedersen Device) was a straight, rimless cartridge used in the French Modèle 1935 pistol, as well as the MAS-38 submachine gun.

Description
The cartridge was developed for the United States and secretly produced in quantity too late for its intended use during World War I. The United States scrapped the weapons built for the cartridge between the world wars. France adopted weapons for the cartridge and those weapons saw combat use; so the cartridge is best known by its French name.

The French military were introduced to the cartridge when the US demonstrated the Pedersen device after the end of World War I in Le Mans and again when John Browning exhibited a carbine in the same caliber in 1920. The US .30 Pedersen cartridge (auto pistol ball cartridge caliber .30 Model of 1918 or .30-18 Automatic) used in the Pedersen device was the basis for the 7.65×20mm Long.

Remington Arms produced 65 million cartridges for the Pedersen device between 1918 and 1920. French 7.65×20mm Long ammunition was manufactured in quantity from approximately 1935 to 1960.  In 2019, Steinel Ammunition began producing 7.65X20mm Long, making new ammunition available again.

See also
 .30 Super Carry
 7 mm caliber
 7.65 mm caliber
 List of handgun cartridges

References
 Barnes, Frank C. Cartridges of the World 3rd Edition, 1972 Digest Books, 
 Sharpe, Philip B. The Rifle in America 1958 Funk & Wagnalls, New York
 Hatcher, Julian S. Hatcher's Notebook 1966 Stackpole Books, Harrisburg, Pennsylvania,

Notes

.32 Longue firearms
Pistol and rifle cartridges
Military cartridges